Cristian Álvarez may refer to:
Cristian Álvarez (musician) (born 1972), Argentine rock musician known as Pity
Cristian Álvarez (Salvadoran footballer) (born 1978), Salvadoran footballer
Cristian Álvarez (footballer, born January 1978), Argentine football defender/midfielder 
Cristián Álvarez (footballer, born 1980), Chilean football defender
Cristian Álvarez (footballer, born 1983), Guatemalan football goalkeeper
Cristian Álvarez (footballer, born 1985), Argentine football goalkeeper
Cristián Álvarez (footballer, born 1992), Argentine football midfielder